National Reform Movement may refer to different political parties around the world:

 National Reform Movement (Antigua and Barbuda)
 National Reform Movement (Iraq)
 National Reform Movement (Ireland)
 National Reformation Movement (Jamaica)